Gonbo Rangjon is a stand-alone lofty rocky precipice located south of Kargyak village in the Lungnak valley, Zanskar, in the Union Territory of Ladakh in India. It is considered to be holy and referred to as God's Mountain by the local inhabitants who practice Tibetan Buddhism. Gonbo Rangjon lies along the Darcha - Padum trek route and the Darcha - Padum road.

References

Mountains of Ladakh
Kargil district